Danaus, commonly called tigers, milkweeds, monarchs, wanderers, and queens, is a genus of butterflies in the tiger butterfly tribe. They are found worldwide, including North America, South America, Africa, Asia, Indonesia and Australia. For other tigers see the genus, Parantica.

Taxonomy 
Following the review of Smith et al. (2005), 12 species are provisionally accepted based on morphological, mtDNA 12S rRNA and cytochrome c oxidase subunit I, and nuclear DNA 18S rRNA and EF1 subunit α sequence data:

This genus was formerly split into the subgenera Danaus, Salatura, and Anosia, but this arrangement has been abolished. While the first (the 2–3 monarch butterflies) and Salatura (species ismare, genutia, affinis, and melanippus) do indeed seem to be clades, the relationship of these to the other species, especially the puzzling D. dorippus, is not clear.

Hybridization producing fertile offspring is known to occur between some species, confounding mtDNA data; this seems to be especially true in the case of D. dorippus (Smith et al. 2005). In addition, male-killing Spiroplasma infection has been shown in D. chrysippus and probably also occurs in other species (Jiggins et al. 2000); the consequences for speciation and evolution are probably similar to those observed in infection with male-killing strains of the better-researched Wolbachia bacteria.

Phylogeny 

Phylogeny of the genus (without D. cleophile).

Synonyms of Danaus species and subspecies 

 Source: The higher classification of Nymphalidae, at Nymphalidae.net
 Note: Names preceded by an equal sign ( = ) are synonyms, homonyms, rejected names, or invalid names. Synonymy, given below in abbreviated form, is from Ackery & Vane-Wright (1984).

Tribe Danaini Boisduval, 1833
 Danaus Kluk, 1802 ( = Danaida Latreille, 1804; = Limnas Hübner, 1806; = Danais Latreille, 1807; = Danaus Latreille, 1809; = Anosia Hübner, 1816; = Festivus Crotch, 1872; = Salatura Moore, 1880; = Nasuma Moore, 1883; = Tasitia Moore, 1883; = Danaomorpha Kremky, 1925; = Panlymnas Bryk, 1937; = Diogas d'Almeida, 1938)
 Danaus cleophile (Godart, 1819) ( original name = Danais cleophile Godart, 1819)
 Danaus plexippus (Linnaeus, 1758) ( original name = Papilio plexippus Linnaeus, 1758; = misippiformis Meuschen, 1781; = archippus Fabricius, 1793; = menippe Hübner, 1816; = megalippe Hübner, 1826; = leucogyne Butler, 1884; = fumosus Hulstaert, 1886; = pulchra Strecker, 1900; = nigrippus Haensch, 1909; = americanus Gunder, 1927; = nivosus Gunder, 1927; = curassavicae Fabricius, 1938; = portoriciensis Clark, 1941; = tobagi Clark, 1941; = disjuncta Dufrane, 1948; = bipunctata Dufrane, 1948; = obliterata Dufrane, 1948)
 Danaus erippus (Cramer, 1775) ( original name = Papilio erippus Cramer, 1775 ( = larensis Köhler, 1929; = asclepiadis Fabricius, 1938)
 Danaus ismare (Cramer, 1780) ( original name = Papilio ismare Cramer, 1780; = ismareola Butler, 1866; = fulvus Ribbe, 1890; = celebensis Rothschild, 1892; = felicia Fruhstorfer, 1907; = goramica Fruhstorfer, 1907; = alba Morishita, 1981)
 Danaus genutia (Cramer, 1779) ( original name = Papilio genutia Cramer, 1779; = adnana Swinhoe, 1917; = albipars Talbot, 1943; = alexis Waterhouse & Lyell, 1914; = bandjira Martin, 1911; = bimana Martin, 1911; = connectens Moulton, 1921; = conspicua Butler, 1866; = grynion Fruhstorfer, 1907; = intensa Moore, 1883; = intermedia Moore, 1883; = kyllene Fruhstorfer, 1910; = laratensis Butler, 1883; = leucoglene Felder & Felder, 1865; = niasicus Fruhstorfer, 1899; = nipalensis Moore, 1877; = partita Fruhstorfer, 1897; = plexippus auctt. nec Linnaeus, 1758; = sumatrana Moore, 1883; = sumbana Talbot, 1943; = telmissus Fruhstorfer, 1910; = tuak Pryer & Cator, 1894; = tychius Fruhstorfer, 1910; = uniens Martin, 1911; = wetterensis Fruhstorfer, 1899; = yuchingkini Murayama & Shimonoya, 1960 (hybrid chrysippus x genutia, Kurosawa, 1973)
 Danaus affinis (Fabricius, 1775) ( original name = Papilio affinis Fabricius, 1775; = abigar Eschscholtz, 1821; = adustus Godman & Salvin, 1882; = affinoides Fruhstorfer, 1899; = albistriga Talbot, 1943; = albonotata Howarth, 1962; = artenice Cramer, 1781; = aruana Moore, 1883; = astakos Fruhstorfer, 1906; = batjana Fruhstorfer, 1899; = bipuncta Talbot, 1943; = biseriata Butler, 1882; = bonguensis Fruhstorfer, 1899; = cecilia Bouganville, 1837; = chionippe Hübner, 1823; = cometho Godman & Salvin, 1888; = coriacea Fruhstorfer, 1906; = decentralis Fruhstorfer, 1899; = decipiens Butler, 1882; = decipientis Strand, 1914; = djampeana Van Eecke, 1915; = fergussonia Fruhstorfer, 1907; = ferruginea Butler, 1876; = fuliginosa Hagen, 1894; = fulgurata Butler, 1866; = fuscata Talbot, 1943; = galacterion Fruhstorfer, 1906; = gelanor Waterhouse & Lyell, 1914; = hegesippinus Röber, 1891; = insolata Butler, 1870; = jimiensis Miller & Miller, 1978; = jobiensis Grose-Smith, 1894; = kapaura Talbot, 1943; = kawiensis Fruhstorfer, 1899; = kiriwina Fruhstorfer, 1907; = leucippis Röber, 1891; = litoralis Doherty, 1891; = luxurians Fruhstorfer, 1907; = malayana Fruhstorfer, 1899; = molyssa Fruhstorfer, 1907; = mysolica Moore, 1883; = mytilene Felder & Felder, 1860; = nigrita Moore, 1883; = nore Swinhoe, 1917; = nubila Butler, 1866; = obscura Capronnier, 1886; = oesypera Talbot, 1943; = olga Swinhoe, 1917; = oros Fruhstorfer, 1907; = paradoxa Röber, 1939; = philene Stoll 1782; = piepersi Kalis, 1933; = pittakus Fruhstorfer, 1907; = pleistarchus Fruhstorfer, 1912; = pseudophilene Fruhstorfer, 1907; = pullata Butler, 1866; = rubrica Fruhstorfer, 1906; = sabrona Talbot, 1943; = sangira Fruhstorfer, 1899; = signata Talbot, 1943; = snelleni Kalis, 1933; = strephon Fruhstorfer, 1907; = subnigra Joicey & Talbot, 1922; = subnubila Fruhstorfer, 1907; = tambora Fruhstorfer, 1899; = taroena Van Eecke, 1915; = taruna Fruhstorfer, 1899; = transfuga Fruhstorfer, 1907; = tualana Talbot, 1943; = vandeldeni Kalis, 1933; = vorkeinus Röber, 1866; = wentholti Martin, 1914; = woodlarkiana Fruhstorfer, 1907)
 Danaus melanippus (Cramer, 1777) ( original name = Papilio melanippus Cramer, 1777; = hegesippus Cramer, 1777; = lotis Cramer, 1779; = thoe Hübner, 1816; = edmondii Bougainville, 1837; = nesippus C. Felder, 1862; = eurydice Butler, 1884; = celebensis Staudinger, 1889; = erebus, Röber, 1891 ; = haruhasa Doherty, 1891; = pietersii Doherty, 1891; = taimanu Doherty, 1891; = fruhstorferi Röber, 1897; = keteus Hagen, 1898; = indicus Fruhstorfer, 1899; = malossona Fruhstorfer, 1899; = lotina Fruhstorfer, 1904; = umbrosus Fruhstorfer, 1906; = philozigetes Fruhstorfer, 1907; = mezentius Fruhstorfer, 1910; = meridionigra Martin, 1913; = edwardi Van Eecke, 1914; = insularis Moulton, 1921; = albescens Röber, 1927; = kotoshonis Matsumara, 1929; = camorta Evans, 1932)
 Danaus eresimus (Cramer, 1777) ( original name = Papilio eresimus Cramer, 1777; = ares d'Almeida, 1944; = asclepidea Fabricius, 1938; = dilucida Forbes, 1939; = erginus Godman & Salvin, 1897; = estevana Talbot, 1943; = icensis Fuchs, 1954; = montezuma Talbot, 1943; = tethys Forbes, 1943)
 Danaus plexaure (Godart, 1819) ( original name = Danais plexaure Godart, 1819; = brasiliensis Capronnier, 1874)
 Danaus gilippus (Cramer, 1775) ( original name = Papilio gilippus Cramer, 1775; = berenice Cramer, 1779; = vincedoxici Hübner, 1816; = vincetoxici Hübner, 1816; = cleothera Godart, 1819; = manuja Eschscholtz, 1821; = xanthippus Felder & Felder, 1860; = thersippus Bates, 1863; = jamaicensis Bates, 1864; = strigosa Bates, 1864; = hermippus Felder & Felder, 1865; = nivosus Godman & Salvin, 1897; = esperanza Hoffman, 1924; = centralis Joicey & Talbot, 1925; = kempfferi Hall, 1925; = kerri Comstock, 1925; = vincetoxici Fabricius, 1938; = candidus Clark, 1941; = gilippina Hoffman, 1940; = wheeleri Talbot, 1943; = roedingeri Fuchs, 1954)
 Danaus chrysippus (Linnaeus, 1758) ( original name = Papilio chrysippus Linnaeus, 1758; = albinus Lanz, 1896; = amplifascia Talbot, 1943; = anomala Dufrane, 1948; = asclepiadis Gagliardi, 1811; = auriflava Van Eecke, 1914; = axantha Hayward, 1922; = bataviana Moore, 1883; = bipunctata Dufrane, 1948; = bowringi Moore, 1883; = candidata Hayward, 1922; = chrysipellus Strand, 1910; = clarippus Weymer, 1884; = completa Dufrane, 1948; = cratippus Felder, 1860; = deficiens Dufrane, 1948; = duplicata Dufrane, 1948; = duponti Dufrane, 1948; = evanescens Storace, 1949; = fuscippus Van Eecke, 1915; = gelderi Snellen, 1891; = hanoiensis Dufrane, 1948; = hypermnestra Stoneham, 1958; = impunctata Dufrane, 1948; = infumata Aurivillius, 1898; = joannisi Dufrane, 1948; = kanariensis Fruhstorfer, 1898; = lemeemagdalenae Lemeé, 1950; = limbata Matsumura, 1929; = luxurians Dufrane, 1948; = margarita Röber, 1926; = orientis Aurivillius, 1909; = ornata Dufrane, 1948; = petilia Stoll, 1790; = praealbata Froreich, 1928; = pseudopetilea Kalis, 1933; = radiata Dufrane, 1948; = reducta Dufrane, 1948; = rubra Van Eecke, 1915; = semialbinus Strand, 1910; = subpurpurea Matsumura, 1929; = subreducta Dufrane, 1948; = vigelii Heylaerts, 1884; = witteellus Overlaet, 1955; = yuchingkini Murayama & Shimonoya, 1960 (hybrid D. chrysippus x D. genutia)
 Danaus chrysippus chrysippus (Linnaeus, 1758)
 Danaus chrysippus aegyptius (Schreber, 1759) ( original name = Papilio aegyptius Schreber, 1759; = Danaus chrysippus klugii Butler, 1886; = Papilio alcippus Cramer, 1777; = Danaus chrysippus liboria Hulstaert, 1931; = Danaus chrysippus alcippoides Moore, 1883; = Danaus chrysippus dorippus Klug, 1845; = Danaus chrysippus transiens Suffert, 1900)

References

 Ackery, P. & Vane-Wright, R. (1984). Milkweed Butterflies: Their Cladistics and Biology. London: British Museum (Natural History.
 Jiggins, F. M.; Hurst, G. D. D.; Jiggins, C. D.; Schulenburg, J. H. G. v. D. & Majerus, M. E. N. (2000). The butterfly Danaus chrysippus is infected by a male-killing Spiroplasma bacterium. Parasitology 120(5): 439–446.  (HTML abstract)
 Lushai, G., Goulson, D., Allen, J. A., Maclean, N., Smith, D. A. S., & Gordon, I. J. (2003). Incomplete sexual isolation in sympatry between subspecies of the butterfly Danaus chrysippus (L.) and the creation of a hybrid zone. Heredity, 90(3), 236-246.
 Smith, D. A. S., Gordon, I. J., Lushai, G., Goulson, D., Allen, J. A., & Maclean, N. (2002). Hybrid queen butterflies from the cross Danaus chrysippus (L.) x D. gilippus (Cramer): Confirmation of species status for the parents and further support for Haldane's Rule. Biological Journal of the Linnean Society, 76(4), 535-544.
 Smith, D. A. S., Lushai, G., & Allen, J. A. A. (2005). A classification of Danaus butterflies (Lepidoptera: Nymphalidae) based upon data from morphology and DNA. Zoological Journal of the Linnean Society, 144(2), 191-212.

 
Nymphalidae genera
Nymphalidae of South America
Taxa named by Jan Krzysztof Kluk